Will You Be My Friend? is a studio album by the American folk trio the Roches, released in 1994 on Baby Boom Music. It was the group's only album of children's music. Suzzy Roche considered it among the most satisfying albums on which she had worked. The Roches' brother and some of their children appeared on the album. The title track is about having to make friends at a new school.

Critical reception

The Orlando Sentinel deemed the album "an all-ages delight." The Salt Lake Tribune called it "quirky, brash and wistful."

AllMusic called the album "a true children's album, featuring songs all thematically aimed at younger listeners ... That the Roches are able to manage this without alienating their adult audience is a testament to their strengths as a band."

Track listing

 "Do the Boodanee"
 "Disappointed"
 "Will You Be My Friend?"
 "Rover"
 "Uncle Dave"
 "The Laundry"
 "Postcard"
 "When Kids Are Mean"
 "My New Bicycle"
 "Here We Go"
 "Little Bitty Betty"
 "Lovey"
 "Goodnight"

References

1994 albums
The Roches albums